Graywolf Press is an independent, non-profit publisher located in Minneapolis, Minnesota. Graywolf Press publishes fiction, non-fiction, and poetry.

Graywolf Press collaborates with organizations such as the College of Saint Benedict, the Mellon Foundation, and Farrar, Straus and Giroux.

Graywolf Press currently publishes about 27 books a year, including the Graywolf Press Nonfiction Prize winner, the recipient of the Emily Dickinson First Book Award, and several translations supported by the Lannan Foundation.

History

Graywolf Press was founded by Scott Walker and Kathleen Foster in 1974, in a space provided by Copper Canyon Press in Port Townsend, Washington. The press was named for the nearby Graywolf Ridge and Graywolf River, and for the canid. The press had early successes publishing poetry heavyweights like Denis Johnson and Tess Gallagher. In 1984, Graywolf Press was incorporated as a 501(c)3 non-profit organization, and moved to St. Paul, Minnesota in 1985 with the support of the National Endowment for the Arts. Fiona McCrae, formerly of Faber and Faber, became the director of Graywolf Press in 1994, following the departure of Scott Walker. In 2009, Graywolf Press moved its publishing operations to the historic Warehouse District of downtown Minneapolis, Minnesota.

Books and authors

The Graywolf publication list includes novels, short stories, memoirs, essays, and poetry by writers such as Maggie Nelson, Deb Olin Unferth, Eula Biss, Elizabeth Alexander, Kevin Barry, Charles Baxter, Sven Birkerts, Ron Carlson, Maile Chapman, Mark Doten, Percival Everett, James Franco, Dana Gioia, Albert Goldbarth, Linda Gregg, Eamon Grennan, Matthea Harvey, Tony Hoagland, Jane Kenyon, William Kittredge, J. Robert Lennon, Ander Monson, Per Petterson, Benjamin Percy, Carl Phillips, Catie Rosemurgy, Tracy K. Smith, A. Igoni Barrett, Nuruddin Farah William Stafford, David Treuer, Brenda Ueland, and Binyavanga Wainaina.

Awards
Graywolf Press won the 2015 AWP Small Press Publisher Award given by the Association of Writers & Writing Programs that "acknowledges the hard work, creativity, and innovation" of small presses and "their contributions to the literary landscape" of the US.

Graywolf Press Prizes

The Graywolf Press Nonfiction Prize, founded in 2005, "seeks to acknowledge – and honor – the great traditions of literary nonfiction” by publishing “the boldest and most innovative books from emerging nonfiction writers" (Robert Polito). Submissions of finished books to the Nonfiction Prize are welcomed from previously unpublished U.S. authors. The winner is announced in April of each year. Graywolf also oversees publication of winners of the Academy of American Poets' Walt Whitman Award, as well as every third winner of the Cave Canem Poetry Prize.

Graywolf Press Nonfiction Prize winners 
 2020: Voice of the Fish by Lars Horn
 2018: Zat Lun by Thirii Myo Kyaw Myint
 2017: The Collected Schizophrenias by Esmé Weijun Wang
2014: Riverine by Angela Palm
 2013: Leaving Orbit: Notes from the Last Days of American Spaceflight by Margaret Lazarus Dean
 2011: The Empathy Exams: Essays by Leslie Jamison
 2010: The Grey Album by Kevin Young
 2008: Notes from No Man's Land by Eula Biss
 2007: Black Glasses Like Clark Kent by Terese Svoboda
 2006: Neck Deep and Other Predicaments by Ander Monson
 2005: Frantic Transmissions to and from Los Angeles by Kate Braverman

Graywolf Press Africa Prize winners 
Since 2018, Graywolf Press has also awarded a prize for "a first novel manuscript by an African author primarily residing in Africa." The winners include:

 2019: American Girl and Boy from Shobrakheit by Noor Naga
 2018: The House of Rust by Khadija Abdalla Bajaber

References

External links
 
 Graywolf is turning readers into donors > by Marianne Combs > Minnesota Public Radio December 29, 2006
 Lannon Foundation Profile of Graywolf Press
 Minnesota: land of long-lasting small presses by Marianne Combs, Minnesota Public Radio October 8, 2004
 Profile of Graywolf Press, Poets.Org 
 mnartists.org > Thinking Souls: An Interview with Mary Matze by Shannon Gibney > August 17, 2006

Book publishing companies based in Minnesota
Companies based in Minneapolis
Culture of Minneapolis
Non-profit organizations based in Minnesota
Publishing companies established in 1974
1974 establishments in Minnesota